The Minto School at Major Ave. and Third St. in Minto, North Dakota was built in 1895.  It has also been known as the Walsh County Historical Society Museum.  It was listed on the National Register of Historic Places in 1992.

See also
Photo at NSUC Institute for Regional Studies

References

School buildings on the National Register of Historic Places in North Dakota
Queen Anne architecture in North Dakota
Romanesque Revival architecture in North Dakota
School buildings completed in 1895
Schools in Walsh County, North Dakota
National Register of Historic Places in Walsh County, North Dakota
Historical societies in North Dakota
1895 establishments in North Dakota